John (died 1207) was a late 12th century and early 13th century Tironensian monk and bishop. By the time he first appears in the records, as Bishop-elect of Aberdeen in December 1199, he was the prior of Kelso Abbey, that is, deputy to the Abbot of Kelso. He achieved consecration as Bishop of Aberdeen by 20 June 1200, though the date on which this took place is unknown.

John's episcopate, like many from this era, is badly documented, and little is known about his activities. He assisted at the Provincial Council held by the Papal legate, John of Salerno, at Perth in December 1200. His name occurs as a witness to three charters of David of Huntingdon, Lord of Garioch and Earl of Huntingdon, charters preserved in the cartulary of Lindores Abbey. Ratifications of grants made by Gille Críst, Earl of Mar are recorded. He died on 13 October 1207.

References
 Dowden, John, The Bishops of Scotland, ed. J. Maitland Thomson, (Glasgow, 1912), p. 101
 Innes, Cosmo, Registrum Episcopatus Aberdonensis: Ecclesie Cathedralis Aberdonensis Regesta Que Extant in Unum Collecta, Vol. 1, (Edinburgh, 1845), pp. xxi-ii
 Keith, Robert, An Historical Catalogue of the Scottish Bishops: Down to the Year 1688, (London, 1924), pp. 105–6
 Watt, D.E.R., Fasti Ecclesiae Scotinanae Medii Aevi ad annum 1638, 2nd Draft, (St Andrews, 1969), p. 1

1207 deaths
Bishops of Aberdeen
Tironensians
Scottish priors
13th-century Scottish Roman Catholic bishops
Year of birth unknown